Glen Dawson may refer to:

 Glen Dawson (athlete) (1906–1968), American steeplechase runner
 Glen Dawson (mountaineer) (1912–2016), American mountaineer